Environmental restoration is closely allied with (or perhaps sometimes used interchangeably with) ecological restoration or environmental remediation.  In the U.S., remediation is the term used more in the realms of industry, public policy, and civil services. Environmental restoration is a term common in the citizens’ environmental movement.  

In the 1987 edition of his book Restoring the Earth: How Americans are Working to Renew our Damaged Environment, scientific editor and writer John J. Berger defined environmental restoration (or “natural resource restoration”) as follows: "… A process in which a damaged resource is renewed.  Biologically. Structurally. Functionally."

Natural environment

The ongoing growth of the human population in the world and its associated impacts, mean that the need for ecological restoration has become increasingly clear. The old adage "an ounce of prevention is worth a pound of cure" points to the fact that ecological restoration is not always successful (or only over long spans of time) and, when feasible, is often difficult and expensive. Environmental restoration is often neglected, either being overlooked or being deemed inexpedient or of a low priority. However, in much of the industrialized world, it has been increasingly demanded by the public, at least since the early 1970s if not before.

The interest and activity in environmental restoration have given rise to a new branch of research and applied techniques within biology, restoration ecology.

Environmental restoration has been applied in aquatic situations (lake environmental restoration, streams environmental restoration, rivers environmental restoration, wetlands environmental restoration, etc.) and terrestrial ones (grasslands, forests, deserts, flatlands, hill country, mountain slopes, etc.).

Approaches

Environmental restoration involves many different approaches and technologies depending on the requirements of the situation. It can involve heavy equipment like cranes, graders, bulldozers, or excavators, and also hand processes like the planting of trees and other vegetation. It can involve high-tech processes such as those applied in the careful environmental control required in fish-hatchery procedures. Today, computerized regulation is often being utilized in these processes. Computer-based mapping has also become an important dimension of restorative work, as has computer modelling.

In some situations, environmental restorative work is handled entirely by professionals working with skilled operators and technicians. In others, ordinary local community members may do much of the work, acquiring skills as the project proceeds. An example of this approach can be seen in Project Maitai where the Nelson City Council, New Zealand, has worked with community groups, such as Friends of the Maitai and local schools, to restore the Maitai River and its tributaries.

Ecological restoration markets
Although the international field of restoration is driven primarily by the non-profit, government and academic sectors, in the U.S and certain other countries (e.g. Australia, which has a robust mining restoration sector), there are active markets for ecological restoration. The U.S. market blossomed shortly after Congress passed the Clean Water Act and the Environmental Protection Agency issued implementing regulations aimed at preventing the loss of streams and wetlands, and in the wake of the passage of the Endangered Species Act of 1973. The Surface Mining Control and Reclamation Act of 1977 also created restoration opportunities. When regulations stemming from these laws came online in the mid-1980s, there were few firms that were qualified or experienced in performing large-scale restoration projects. The first estimate of the dollars and jobs in the U.S. was $9.5 billion in annual sales, with 126,000 people employed.

US military and Navy
In 1975, the DOD started cleaning up contaminated military sites under the "Installation Restoration Program" . In 1986, the Comprehensive Environmental Response, Compensation, and Liability Act from 1976 was amended to create the "Defense Environmental Restoration Program". In 2001, DoD established the "Military Munitions Response Program" for sites known or suspected to contain unexploded ordnance, discarded military munitions, or munitions constituents.

The Department of the Navy documents its environmental restoration in its administrative record file collections for each facility. As of 2022, these were grouped into 5 US regions, namely Northwest, Hawaii, Southwest, Midatlantic and Southeast.

See also
Biodegradation
Bioremediation
Buffalo Commons
Dutch standards
Industrial nature
List of environment topics
Natural attenuation
Phytoremediation
Richard St. Barbe Baker
Stream restoration

References

External links

Society for Ecological Restoration
Stream Restoration Links
Restoration Ecology Links
Restore the Earth site
Arid Lands and Desert Restoration
 Sustainable Ecological Restoration . 
 American Society of Professional Wetland Engineers (ASPWE) 
EEMP - a non-profit 501 (c) 3 organization dedicated to communicate the lessons of rehabilitation through media around the world.